Nítkovice is a municipality and village in Kroměříž District in the Zlín Region of the Czech Republic. It has about 200 inhabitants.

Notable people
Josef František Munclinger (1888–1954), opera singer

References

Villages in Kroměříž District